is a bus company operating in the central and western parts of Toyama Prefecture, Japan. Contrary to its name, the company no longer operates railway lines. Its last Manyō Line was handed over to Manyōsen in 2002.

Outline
As it discontinued all railway lines in 2002 due to serious deficit, the company changed its corporation name from Kaetsunō Railway (加越能鉄道) to Kaetsunō Bus (加越能バス).

Business in the past

Railway

Routes 
Man'yōsen Shinminatokō Line (Transferred to Manyosen in 2002)
Man'yōsen Takaoka Kidō Line (Transferred to Manyosen in 2002)
Kaetsu Line (discontinued in 1972)
Fushiki Line (discontinued in 1971)

Manyō Line 
The Takaoka Kidō Line and the Shiminatoko Line were operated by Kaetsuno Railway and was called the Manyō Line. As the number of passengers decreased, the railway company discontinued these lines and replaced them by route buses. In 2001, due to local opposition, Kaetsuno Railway, Toyama Chiho Railway, Toyama Prefecture, and Takaoka City established the third sector company named Manyosen Company which now operates Manyō Line, after it was transferred to Manyosen from Kaetsuno Railway in 2002.

Bus routes 

Kaetsuno Bus Company runs buses bound for Gokayama and Shirakawa-gō that are World Heritage Sites.

References

External links
 Official site

Defunct railway companies of Japan
Companies based in Toyama Prefecture
Railway companies disestablished in 2002
Railway companies established in 1950
Japanese companies established in 1950
Japanese companies disestablished in 2002
Bus companies of Japan